Colin Mathura-Jeffree (born 12 May 1972) is a New Zealand model, actor, television host and spokesperson. He is best known to audiences for being one of the judges of New Zealand's Next Top Model and New Zealand's Hottest Home Baker.

Career

Modelling
Mathura-Jeffree has been a model for 20 years. He has graced the catwalk for iconic fashion houses such as Working Style and Versace and modelled for many international fashion magazines. Mathura-Jeffree is currently the face of Tourism Australia "shopping & shows campaign" for New Zealand working for APN New Zealand.

Fashion and beauty
Mathura-Jeffree was awarded the title of Special Ambassador representing the Miss World franchise holder, the New Zealand Asia Pacific Trust, at the 2007 Miss World competition in Sanya, China. He has judged pageants including the Ellerslie Racecourse Fashion in the Field contest.

In 2011 to 2017, he was the VIP Ambassador for New Zealand Fashion Week and opened the event in 2016. In the 2017 event he only wore clothes from Hospice Opportunity Shops.

Mathura-Jeffree was named New Zealand's sexiest man in 2012 by Metro. and was named New Zealand's Man of the Year in 2012 by social page photographer Norrie Montgomery.

Mathura-Jeffree was a judge for the Miss South Pacific Beauty Pageant 2013 in the Solomon Islands. In 2017 he was named a REMIX Magazine Icon at their 20-year anniversary Ball featuring their 20 favourite celebrities in print. He was voted by the public in the METRO Magazine Awards issue to be the 'Best Dressed Celebrity 2017'.

Television
Mathura-Jeffree's acting debut was as the Prince of India in the Xena: Warrior Princess television series (1999), where he played the reincarnation of Gabrielle into a powerful and handsome warrior willing to sacrifice himself to save his Kingdom.

Other roles include a case solving scientist in Lifetime Television's Reckless Behavior: Caught on Tape (also called Stolen Life) helping Emma Norman (Odette Yustman) opposite Antonio Sabàto Jr.

Mathura-Jeffree has appeared as a judge and runway mentor on the New Zealand model reality series New Zealand's Next Top Model. He has also hosted other TV shows, such as New Zealand's Hottest Home Baker and The Great NZ Dance Masala. In 2010, he was a guest judge on two episodes of America's Next Top Model.

He is also the face of Tourism New Zealand's American advertising campaign.

Movies
Mathura-Jeffree played the lead protagonist in the Bollywood movie and romantic comedy Love Has No Language opposite Celina Jaitley, Miss India 2001.

2017 Doc Edge celebrated excellence and achievement with presenting Documentary Film Awards during the Festival. Local and international awards were presented in various categories. The 2017 awards night was held as part of the opening night gala in Auckland on Wednesday, 24 May at Q Theatre. The 2017 jury panel included Mathura-Jeffree.

Charitable work
In 2010 Mathura-Jeffree became a goodwill ambassador and spokesperson for the UK-based charity The Railway Children. The charity works worldwide as emergency interventions for children arriving vulnerable and alone at railway stations, particularly Victoria Station in Mumbai where the problem is acute and where Mathura-Jeffree has had personal experience. Inspired by the work of the charity, he has given a promise to raise awareness and funds for The Railway Children and to return to India to see the charity's work for himself.

In 2013 Mathura-Jeffree became Alzheimers New Zealand's first champion for dementia. In this role he works alongside Alzheimers NZ in promoting wider understanding of the condition. Mathura-Jeffree's grandmother Eileen died in 1998 after a long struggle with Alzheimer's disease, the most common form of dementia.

Mathura-Jeffree is a quiet supporter of a number of charities including StarShip Hospice and Cure kids.

See also
 List of New Zealand television personalities

References

External links
 
 Colin Mathura-Jeffree at NZ On Screen
 

New Zealand male models
New Zealand male television actors
1972 births
Living people
New Zealand people of Indian descent
Anglo-Indian people